Flamboyant is the debut studio album by American singer and songwriter Dorian Electra. The album was self-released by Electra on July 17, 2019. A deluxe edition featuring four new tracks and a remix was released on January 17, 2020. It was promoted by the singles "Career Boy", "Man To Man", "Flamboyant", and "Daddy Like". Music videos were released for "Adam & Steve" and "Guyliner". The album received critical acclaim from critics, who praised the production, LGBTQ related lyrics and Electra’s vocal performances. 

Electra released all of the stems for the album for fans to remix on January 17, 2020. An album featuring instrumentals of every song on the deluxe edition was made available on May 1, 2020. An album of voice memo demo recordings of songs from the album was released on May 14, 2020.

Flamboyant was included on multiple critics' "best albums of 2019" lists, including Paper at number 5 and Dazed at number 14.

Composition and themes
Flamboyant is an experimental pop, electropop, baroque pop, and hyperpop album that features elements of various genres including EDM, funk, dubstep, trap, R&B, electronica, new wave, and bubblegum pop. The album focuses on themes of masculinity and queerness. Many of their songs deal with gender stereotypes and attempt to view them in a new light. In an interview, Electra said "I wanted to explore different masculine characters or tropes to make the themes accessible and relatable and fun too".

Track listing

Notes
 signifies vocal producer
 signifies remix producer
'Freaky 4 Life' is stylized as 'fReAkY 4 Life.'

Personnel
Dorian Electra — vocals (all tracks), songwriting (all tracks)
Weston Allen — saxophone consultant (track 1)
Count Baldor — remix producer (track 16)
Dylan Brady — production (tracks 3, 6, 9, 10, 14, 16), songwriting (tracks 3, 6, 9, 10, 14, 16), mixing (tracks 3, 6, 9, 14)
Ethan Budnick (Robokid) — songwriting (1, 4, 13), production (1, 4, 13), mixing (tracks 1, 4, 13)
Paul Cardon — mixing (track 7)
Eric Cross (Socialchair) — songwriting (tracks 5, 8), production (tracks 5, 8), mixing (tracks 8, 10. 16)
Bonnie McKee — songwriting (tracks 3, 14)
Rob Murray — mastering (all tracks)
Zak Pischnotte — saxophone (track 1)
Jaan "Umru" Rothenberg — songwriting (tracks 11, 12, 16), production (tracks 11, 12, 16)
Max Rosenzweig (Diveo) — songwriting (track 15), production (track 15), mixing (track 15)
Peter John Shepard-Vanoudenaren (ABSRDST) — songwriting (tracks 3, 7, 11, 12, 16), production (tracks 3, 7, 11, 12), vocal production (tracks 10, 16), mixing (tracks 11, 12)
Parker Silzer IV — guitars (tracks 10, 16)
David Stagno — guitars (tracks 10, 16)
Jesse John St. Geller — songwriting (track 1)
William Vaughn — songwriting (track 2), production (track 2)
Michael Zarowny — songwriting (tracks 3, 14)

Release history

References

2019 debut albums
Dorian Electra albums
Albums produced by Dylan Brady
Self-released albums